Les Voltigeurs de Québec is a Primary Reserve infantry regiment of the Canadian Forces. It is located at the Quebec City Armoury in Quebec City, Quebec, Canada. The name of the regiment commemorates another older French-speaking Canadian militia light infantry unit, the Canadian Voltigeurs (raised in 1812 and disbanded in 1815). The founder of the Canadian Voltigeurs, Lieutenant-Colonel Charles-Michel d'Irumberry de Salaberry, was the father of the two men who raised Les Voltigeurs de Québec.  The regiment was formed in March 1862, with its headquarters in Quebec City, by the amalgamation into a regiment of eight independent Volunteer Militia Rifle companies. The first of these companies was originally raised in December 1861.  Between 1862 and 1867 these companies were frequently disbanded, reformed and renumbered.  In 1942 it provided an armoured regiment.

The regiment has provided soldiers for service with the United Nations and NATO in places like the Golan Heights, Cyprus, the former Yugoslavia, Egypt, Afghanistan, Sierra Leone and Haiti.

Cap badge

Description
The arms of Salaberry within an annulus Vert fimbriated and inscribed VOLTIGEURS DE QUEBEC in letters Argent, all surmounting the cross of the Order of St. Louis Argent, the whole ensigned by the Royal Crown proper and above a scroll Argent inscribed with the Motto in letters Gules.

Symbolism
The Crown represents service to the Sovereign. The Voltigeurs Canadiens (1812-1815), who were organized as a temporary British Army regular unit and commanded by Lieutenant-Colonel Charles-Michel d'Irumberry de Salaberry for service during the War of 1812, had the reputation of repeatedly repulsing superior American forces. His son, Lieutenant-Colonel Charles René-Léonidas de Salaberry, was the first commanding officer of the regiment when it was formed in 1862. The badge, incorporating the arms and motto "FORCE À SUPERBE MERCY À FOIBLE"" of the family of d'Irumberry de Salaberry, was adopted in 1892 in recognition of this family's services to the military of Canada and the regiment. The Order of Saint Louis, instituted by King Louis XIV of France in 1693, was a notable honour in New France. "VOLTIGEURS DE QUEBEC" is a form of the regimental title.

Lineage

Les Voltigeurs de Québec 
Les Voltigeurs de Québec originated in Quebec City, Quebec on 7 March 1862 as The 9th Battalion Volunteer Militia Rifles, Canada (or "'Voltigeurs of Quebec'"). It was redesignated the 9th Regiment Voltigeurs de Québec on 8 May 1900, and, following the Great War, Les Voltigeurs de Québec on 29 March 1920. During the Second World War it was designated the 2nd (Reserve) Battalion, Les Voltigeurs de Québec on 10 May 1941 and Les Voltigeurs de Québec (Reserve) on 15 September 1944. After the Second World War it was designated Les Voltigeurs de Québec (Motor) on 1 April 1946. On 1 September 1954, it was amalgamated with Le Régiment de Québec (Mitrailleuses) and redesignated Les Voltigeurs de Québec (Mitrailleuses). It was redesignated Les Voltigeurs de Québec on 11 April 1958. On 22 February 1965, it was amalgamated with The Royal Rifles of Canada. The two regiments ceased to be amalgamated on 1 November 1966.

Le Régiment de Québec 
Le Régiment de Québec (Mitrailleuses) originated in St. Ambroise on 9 April 1869 as The Provisional Battalion of Quebec. It was redesignated the 87th Quebec Battalion of Infantry on 27 May 1881 and the 87th Quebec Regiment on 8 May 1900. Following the Great War it was redesignated Le Régiment de Québec on 29 March 1920 and Le Régiment de Québec (Mitrailleuses) on 15 December 1936. During the Second World War it was redesignated the 2nd (Reserve) Battalion, Le Régiment de Québec (Mitrailleuses) on 18 March 1942. Following the Second World War it was redesignated Le Régiment de Québec (Mitrailleuses) on 22 December 1945. On 1 September 1954, it was amalgamated with Les Voltigeurs de Québec (Motor).

Perpetuations
'War of 1812: Les Voltigeurs de Québec perpetuate the Provincial Corps of Light Infantry (Canadian Voltigeurs), the 1st and 2nd Battalions (City of Quebec) (1812–15), the Beauport Division (1812–15) and the 6th Battalion, Select Embodied Militia.

The Great War: The regiment perpetuates the 57th Battalion (Canadien-Français), CEF.

Operational history

The Fenian Raids
The Voltigeurs of Quebec were called out on active service on 8 March 1866, remaining on active service until 31 March 1866.

The North West Rebellion
Les Voltigeurs de Québec were mobilized for active service on 10 April 1885, and served in the Alberta Column of the North West Field Force. The battalion was removed from active service on 24 July 1885.

The Great War
The 9th Regiment Voltigeurs de Québec and details of the 87th Quebec Regiment were placed on active service on 6 August 1914 for local protection duties.

The 57e Bataillon (Canadien-Français), CEF, was authorized on 20 April 1915 and embarked for Britain on 2 June 1916, where on 8 June 1916, its personnel were absorbed by the 69th Battalion (Canadien-Français), CEF, to provide reinforcements to the Canadian Corps in the field. The battalion was disbanded on 11 April 1918.

The Second World War
Details of Les Voltigeurs de Québec and details of Le Régiment de Québec were called out on service on 26 August 1939 and then placed on active service on 1 September 1939, as Les Voltigeurs de Québec, CASF (Details) and Le Régiment de Québec (Mitrailleuses), CASF (Details), for local protection duties. These details were disbanded on 31 December 1940. Details of Les Voltigeurs were again called out on service on 1 January 1941, as Details of 1st (Reserve) Battalion, Les Voltigeurs de Québec, and were disbanded on 5 April 1941.

The regiment mobilized the 1st Battalion, Les Voltigeurs de Québec, CASF, on 10 May 1941. It was converted to armour and redesignated the 24th Army Tank Battalion (Les Voltigeurs de Québec), CAC, CASF, on 26 January 1942. It was redesignated the 24th Reconnaissance Battalion (Les Voltigeurs de Québec), CAC, CASF, on 22 May 1942 and the 24th Reconnaissance Regiment (Les Voltigeurs de Québec), CAC, CASF, on 8 June 1942. On 16 January 1943, it was reconverted to infantry and redesignated the 1st Battalion, Les Voltigeurs de Québec, CASF. It served in Canada in a home defence role as part of the 17th Infantry Brigade, 7th Canadian Infantry Division. It embarked for Britain on 23 July 1943, where it provided reinforcements to units of the Canadian Corps in the field until it was disbanded on 1 November 1943.

Details of Le Régiment de Québec were called out on service on 26 August 1939 and then placed on active service on 1 September 1939, under the designation Le Régiment de Québec (Mitrailleuses), CASF (Details), for local protection duties.41 The details called out on active service were disbanded on 31 December 1940. The regiment subsequently mobilized the 1st Battalion, Le Régiment de Québec, CASF, on 18 March 1942. This unit served in Canada and in a home defence role as part of the 15th Infantry Brigade, 7th Canadian Infantry Division and in Newfoundland on garrison duty. The battalion was disbanded on 22 December 1945 following the cessation of hostilities.

Afghanistan
The regiment contributed volunteers to the various task forces that served in Afghanistan from 2002 to 2014.

Fire
During the night of April 4, 2008, the Quebec City Armoury, (formerly Grande-Allée Armoury ), built in 1887, was destroyed during a fire. In October 2008, regimental institutions and their insurance firm started a lawsuit against the Department of National Defence, for damages, blaming negligence on the part of the government for failing to let the insurance firm personnel inspect the site after the fire. In November 2012, the Government of Canada announced that the armoury would be rebuilt and would remain the historic home of the regiment. The re-built armoury was scheduled to be completed by 2017 and was reopened on 12 May 2018, with the ceremonial reopening presided by the Prime Minister of Canada, Justin Trudeau, who was the reviewing officer and keynote speaker.

Battle honours

Affiliation
 
 The Yorkshire Regiment (14th/15th, 19th and 33rd/76th Foot). - Les voltigeurs were allied to The Duke of Wellington's Regiment (DWR) and The Prince of Wales's Own Regiment of Yorkshire (PWO) prior to the 2006 merger of the PWO, Green Howards and DWR into The new Yorkshire Regiment.

Les Voltigeurs de Québec museum

The museum fosters greater awareness among general public of the regiment's history and traditions. The museum illustrates the military history of the Régiment des Voltigeurs de Québec, the Royal Rifles of Canada and the Quebec Regiment, using artifacts, uniforms, photographs and documents. The museum displays military uniforms, weapons, equipment, medals, private badge collections, scale models, trophies and war memorabilia loaned by Regimental veterans and supporters of the museum.

Bibliography
Les Voltigeurs De Québec : Premier Régiment Canadien-Français by Jacques Castonguay (1987)

Legacy
The Royal Canadian Mint issued a 5-cent silver proof coin celebrating Les Voltigeurs de Québec in 2000; the coin features a baton, drums, and a sash of the Regimental Insignia of Les Voltigeurs de Québec.

Notes and references

External links
 Regimental website
Historica’s Heritage Minute video docudrama about Les Voltigeurs de Québec. (Adobe Flash Player.)

Order of precedence

Les Voltigeurs de Québec
Infantry regiments of Canada in World War II
Military units and formations of Quebec
Military and war museums in Canada
Regimental museums in Canada
British colonial regiments
Military units and formations established in 1862
1862 establishments in Canada
Canadian Militia units of The North-West Rebellion